Kearsarge may refer to:

Places in the United States
Kearsarge, California, in Inyo County
Kearsarge, Michigan, in Houghton County
Kearsarge, New Hampshire, a village in Carroll County
Mount Kearsarge (Merrimack County, New Hampshire), mountain in the New Hampshire towns of Wilmot, Sutton, and Warner
Kearsarge Regional High School, serving several towns in Merrimack County, New Hampshire 
Kearsarge North, a peak in the White Mountains of New Hampshire
Kearsarge House, grand hotel in North Conway, New Hampshire
Kearsarge Pass, a mountain pass in the Sierra Nevada of California
 Kearsarge Peak, a mountain in Inyo County, California
Kearsarge Pinnacles, pillars in Kings Canyon National Park, California

Ships
USS Kearsarge, several ships in the United States Navy
Kearsarge-class battleship in the U.S. Navy

See also
The Battle of the Kearsarge and the Alabama
The Kearsarge at Boulogne